Alloeopage is a genus of moths in the family Geometridae.

Species
 Alloeopage cinerea (Warren, 1896)

References
 Alloeopage at Markku Savela's Lepidoptera and some other life forms

Geometrinae
Geometridae genera